Thomas Granville "Gran" Edwards (1920–1996) was an American professional basketball player. He played in the National Basketball League for the Toledo Jim White Chevrolets in three games during the 1941–42 season and averaged 1.7 points per game.

References 

1920 births
1996 deaths
American men's basketball players
Basketball players from Colorado
Centers (basketball)
People from Delta, Colorado
Toledo Jim White Chevrolets players
Western Colorado Mountaineers men's basketball players